The Thessaloniki Song Festival, officially the Greek Song Festival was a Greek song festival hosted between 1959–1997 and 2005–2008. The host city of the event was initially Athens (1959–1961) but the contest was later moved to Thessaloniki, from which it got its name.

The festival was usually hosted at the Alexandreio Melathron in Thessaloniki.

History
The three initial contests held in Athens were marked by the participation of important Greek musicians such as Manos Hatzidakis and Mikis Theodorakis, who won first prize two times and one time respectively. The first time the contest took place in Thessaloniki in 1962, it was organized by the Thessaloniki International Fair, in partnership with the Greek Music Association, at the stadium of the city's YMCA. The first contest in Thessaloniki also marked the start of Alkis Steas' career as presenter of the show from 1962 until 1980. The first song to win the Thessaloniki Song Festival was "Alysides" (chains) by Kaiti Belinda.

In 1965 the Greek Music Association stopped supporting the event and was replaced by Greece's national broadcaster, the Hellenic Broadcasting Corporation.  Additionally, 1965 also saw the introduction of a committee of judges responsible for determining the winning songs, which in previous years were selected through public voting.  At the time, the contest was dominated by Greek New Wave in music.

The festival of 1972 was marked by two important events. First was the fact that popular Greek singer Tolis Voskopoulos, who was one of the favorites to win the contest, was unable to sing once he walked on stage, which resulted in him being denounced by the public.  In the 1972 Thessaloniki Song Festival pop band Nostradamos won the best new composer and performer prize with the song "Dos Mou to Heri Sou" (Give Me Your Hand) which became a huge success in Greece during the junta years.  Additionally, the contest was marked by a number of camouflaged anti-dictatorial songs in opposition to the Regime of the Colonels, which was in power since 1967. 1974 saw another wave of songs with hidden political messages, this time inspired by the events that followed the collapse of the Greek dictatorship. The winning song of the 1974 edition implicitly referred to Konstantinos Karamanlis, Prime Minister of Greece following the collapse of the dictatorship.

In 1977, popular Greek singer Anna Vissi competed at the festival and won first place. 1980 saw the retirement of the festival's original host since 1962, Alkis Steas, and the participation of Cypriot Greek composer Manos Loizos in the contest. In 1981 and 1982 Manos Hatzidakis organised also a song contest festival in Corfu (city).

In 1991 Greek pop star Sakis Rouvas took part in the contest.

The contest was discontinued in 1997 due to lack of interest, and was later brought back to life in 2005, this time as a co-operation of the Hellenic Broadcasting Corporation, the Thessaloniki International Fair and the Ministry for Macedonia and Thrace.  It was discontinued again in 2008.

Winners

Note: 1 Award later annulled as the song was not original.

See also
Music of Greece

References

 
Music festivals in Greece
Annual events in Thessaloniki
Music festivals established in 1959
Festivals in Thessaloniki
Music in Thessaloniki